

Heahstan (or Eadstanus; died 897) was a medieval Bishop of London.

Heahstan was consecrated between 867 and 896. He died in 897.

Citations

References

External links
 

Bishops of London
897 deaths
Year of birth unknown
9th-century English bishops